The women's 4×200 metre freestyle relay competition of the swimming events at the 2011 World Aquatics Championships took place July 28. The heats and final were held on July 28.

Records
Prior to the competition, the existing world and championship records were as follows.

Results

Heats
17 teams participated in 3 heats.

Final
The final was held at 19:43.

References

External links
World Aquatics Championships: Women's 4×200 metre freestyle relay entry list, from OmegaTiming.com; retrieved 2011-07-23.
FINA World Championships, Swimming: U.S. Dominates Women's 800 Free Relay With Textile Best; Missy Franklin Leads Off With Textile Best, Swimming World Magazine (2011-07-28); retrieved 2011-08-09.

Freestyle relay 4x200 metre, women's
World Aquatics Championships
2011 in women's swimming